Chasing is a metalworking technique.

Chasing may also refer to:

 Chasing (2016 film), a Korean film
 Chasing (2020 film), an Indian film
 "Chasing" (song), a 2014 Gemma Hayes song
 "Chasin'", a 2017 song by Cub Sport from the album Bats
 "Chasin'", a 2012 song by Reks from Straight, No Chaser